Qualitative Inquiry is a peer-reviewed academic journal that covers methodological issues raised by qualitative research in the social sciences. The journal's editors-in-chief are Yvonna Lincoln (Texas A&M University) and Norman K. Denzin (University of Illinois at Urbana–Champaign). It was established in 1995 and is currently published by SAGE Publications.

Abstracting and indexing 
Qualitative Inquiry is abstracted and indexed in Scopus and the Social Sciences Citation Index. According to the Journal Citation Reports, its 2017 impact factor is 1.207, ranking it 44 out of 98 journals in the category "Social Sciences, Interdisciplinary".

References

External links 
 

English-language journals
Publications established in 1995
SAGE Publishing academic journals
Qualitative research journals